Jan Christiaan "Chris" Heunis, DMS (20 April 1927 – 27 January 2006) was a South African Afrikaner lawyer, politician, member of the National Party and cabinet minister in the governments of John Vorster and P. W. Botha. 
 
He was born in 1927 in Uniondale in the Cape Province (now the Western Cape). After studying in George, he continued his studies in law and became a lawyer in 1951. At the same time, he pursued a political career and became head of the National Party in George District and a member of the municipal council. In 1959, he was elected to the Provincial Council.  
  
Heunis was elected to the House of Assembly in 1970, and in 1974 became Minister of Indian Affairs and Tourism in the government of John Vorster. In 1975, he became Minister of Economic Affairs. In 1979, as part of the P. W. Botha Government, he participated in the preparation of a new constitution, and in 1982, became Minister of Constitutional Reform. In this role, he put in place the Tricameral Parliament, gave the right to vote to the Coloureds and Indians, in separate chambers of the South African Parliament. He convinced the leader of the Labour Party, Allan Hendrickse, to agree to this reform.

During this time, he took part in confidential informal interviews in Port Elizabeth between two NP representatives, and two representatives from the ANC. In September 1986, Heunis was unanimously voted leader of the NP in the Cape Province, taking over from President P. W. Botha.

At the beginning of 1989, he assumed the functions of State President for the interim for 100 days when Pieter Botha suffered a cerebral congestion. He was one of the candidates for leadership of the National Party, along with Pik Botha, Barend du Plessis and Frederik de Klerk, but was beaten in the second round of elections. He narrowly avoided defeat in the 1987 election, in which he faced a challenge from former NP MP and diplomat Denis Worrall, but held the seat by 39 votes.

Later, Heunis retired from political life, and did not participate in the elections of 1989, and returned to his law practice in Somerset West with his son Jakkie Heunis. He received an honorary doctorate in philosophy from the University of Stellenbosch, honorary lieutenant-colonel of the police, honorary citizen of George, decorated with the Grand Cordon of the order of the Republic of China, and was father of four boys and one girl. He died in January 2006 in Somerset West after a long illness.

References

External links 
 Article in the Mail and Guardian- January 2006

1927 births
2006 deaths
People from George Local Municipality
Afrikaner people
National Party (South Africa) politicians
Ministers of Home Affairs of South Africa
Members of the House of Assembly (South Africa)
20th-century South African lawyers